Stenosphenus notatus is a species of beetle in the family Cerambycidae. It was described by Olivier in 1795. Larvae of the species breed in dead limbs of Carya species, and occasionally Celtis.

References

Elaphidiini
Beetles described in 1795